Darren Hayman & the Secondary Modern is the second studio album by British singer-songwriter Darren Hayman. It is his first with his backing band the Secondary Modern. It was released by The Track & Field Organisation in 2007.

Track listing
 "Art and Design" – 4:45
 "Rochelle" – 3:04
 "Elizabeth Duke" – 3:31
 "Straight Faced Tracy" – 3:09
 "The Pupil Most Likely" – 3:42
 "Let's Go Stealing" – 3:41
 "Higgins Vs Reardon" – 4:23
 "The Crocodile" – 3:14
 "She's Not For Me" – 3:20
 "The Wrong Thing" – 2:57
 "Apologise" – 4:08
 "Nothing in the Letter" – 3:16

References

2007 albums
Darren Hayman albums